Aleksey Sergeyevich Chernov (born 3 June 1998) is a Russian football goalkeeper. He plays for FC Ufa.

Club career
He made his debut in the Russian Professional Football League for FC Kaluga on 11 October 2015 in a game against FC Dynamo Bryansk.

He made his debut in the Russian Premier League for FC Ufa on 14 July 2019 in a game against FC Ural Yekaterinburg.

On 16 July 2021, he signed with Vejle in Denmark. The deal was terminated on 20 January 2022.

References

External links
 
 
 Profile by Russian Professional Football League

1998 births
People from Kozelsky District
Sportspeople from Kaluga Oblast
Living people
Russian footballers
Russian expatriate footballers
Association football goalkeepers
FC Ufa players
Vejle Boldklub players
Russian Premier League players
Russian First League players
Russian Second League players
Russian expatriate sportspeople in Denmark
Expatriate men's footballers in Denmark